Duwayne Oswald Ewart (born March 22, 1998) is a Canadian soccer player who last played for ProStars FC in League1 Ontario.

Career

Youth
Ewart played youth soccer in Scarborough, before moving on to the Vancouver Whitecaps FC Academy. He later moved on to Vaughan SC, spending some time with their senior team in League1 Ontario club in 2015, where he scored a goal against Sigma FC.

Pittsburgh Riverhounds

Ewart signed a professional contract with United Soccer League side Pittsburgh Riverhounds on March 27, 2016. Ewart made his professional debut on May 21, 2016 in a 2–1 victory over Toronto FC II.

International career
He was named to the U15 national team for the 2013 Copa de México de Naciones.

Ewart played for the Canadian U-17 team at the 2015 CONCACAF U-17 Championship, where he was the team's top goalscorer.

In August 2016, Ewart was called up to the U-20 team for a pair of friendlies against Costa Rica

He also qualifies to play for Jamaica as his father was born in Clarendon and his mother in Kingston.

References

External links

1998 births
Living people
Canadian soccer players
Pittsburgh Riverhounds SC players
Association football forwards
Soccer players from Toronto
Sportspeople from Scarborough, Toronto
USL Championship players
League1 Ontario players
Canadian people of Jamaican descent
Black Canadian soccer players
Vaughan Azzurri players
Unionville Milliken SC players
Pickering FC players
ProStars FC players